Tatiana Bonetti (born 15 December 1991) is an Italian footballer who plays as a forward for Inter Milan and the Italy women's national team.

Club career
Bonetti has previously played for AC Riozzese, UPC Tavagnacco, AGSM Verona, Fiorentina FC and Atlético Madrid.

International career
Bonetti was a member of the Italian Under-19 team that won the 2008 U-19 European Championship, where she scored a winner against Norway.

International goals

Honours

Club
UPC Tavagnacco
 Coppa Italia: 2012–13, 2013–14

AGSM Verona
 Serie A: 2014–15

Fiorentina
 Serie A: 2016–17
 Coppa Italia: 2016–17, 2017–18
 Supercoppa Italiana: 2018

International
Italy U19
 UEFA Women's Under-19 Championship: 2008

Individual
Awards
 AIC Best Women's XI: 2020

References

1991 births
Living people
People from Vigevano
Footballers from Lombardy
Italian women's footballers
Women's association football forwards
U.P.C. Tavagnacco players
A.S.D. AGSM Verona F.C. players
Fiorentina Women's F.C. players
Atlético Madrid Femenino players
Serie A (women's football) players
Italy women's international footballers
Italian expatriate women's footballers
Italian expatriate sportspeople in Spain
Expatriate women's footballers in Spain
Sportspeople from the Province of Pavia